Kobyakovo is a rural locality (a village) in Yurovskoye Rural Settlement, Gryazovetsky District, Vologda Oblast, Russia. The population was 31 as of 2002.

Geography 
Kobyakovo is located 27 km southwest of Gryazovets (the district's administrative centre) by road. Vozdvizhenskoye is the nearest rural locality.

References 

Rural localities in Gryazovetsky District